Spartanburg County School District No. 7 (SCSD7) is a public school district in Spartanburg County, South Carolina, US.

The district includes most of the city of Spartanburg, as well as all of Ben Avon, Drayton and Whitney, most of Camp Croft, and portions of Arkwright, Hilltop, and Saxon. 

Led by Superintendent Jeff Stevens, SCSD7 serves more than 7,000 students and employs approximately 1,200 full-time faculty and staff in twelve schools. SCSD7 also hosts the McCarthy-Teszler School, the Franklin School, the District 7 Early Learning Center, and shares the Daniel Morgan Technology Center with Spartanburg County School District 3. Most of the city of Spartanburg is in this district.

Established in 1884, Spartanburg School District 7 is a small urban school district located in the heart of Upstate South Carolina. District 7 is a majority-minority district with a poverty index nearing 70%, a graduation rate of 85%, and a post-secondary enrollment rate that averages over 62% each year.

Schools
High schools
 Spartanburg High School

Middle schools
 Carver Middle School
 McCracken Middle School
 EP Todd School

Elementary schools

 Jesse Boyd Elementary
 Chapman Elementary(Closed/Consolidated with Houston Elementary 2018–2019)
 Cleveland Academy of Leadership
 Houston Elementary(Closed/Consolidated with Chapman Elementary 2018–2019)
 McCarthy-Teszler School
 Pine Street Elementary
 E.P. Todd School
 Mary H. Wright Elementary
 Drayton Mills Elementary(Opened 2018–2019)

References

External links
 

Spartanburg, South Carolina
School districts in South Carolina
Education in Spartanburg County, South Carolina